is the second live album by Japanese entertainer Miho Nakayama. Released through King Records on November 23, 1994, the album was recorded live at the Nakano Sun Plaza on August 26–27, 1994, during the Miho Nakayama Concert Tour '94 "Pure White". The Limited Edition release included a photo book with highlights from the concert. The standard release, released on March 1, 1995, omits the Prologue, Epilogue, and the "Singles Medley".

The album peaked at No. 18 on Oricon's albums chart and sold over 84,000 copies.

Track listing 
All lyrics are written by Miho Nakayama, except where indicated; all music is composed by KNACK, except where indicated; all music is arranged by KNACK.

Personnel
 Miho Nakayama – vocals
 Keisuke Araki – keyboards
 Yōichi Yamazaki –keyboards, piano
 Kazushi Ueda – guitar
 Masato Saitō – bass
 Hisanori Kumamaru – drums
 Tomo Yamaguchi – percussion
 Mieko Sudō – backing vocals
 Chizuru Sōya – backing vocals

Charts

References

External links
 
 

1994 live albums
Miho Nakayama albums
Japanese-language live albums
King Records (Japan) albums
Albums recorded at Nakano Sun Plaza